Capital punishment in Belgium was formally abolished on August 1, 1996 for all crimes, in both peacetime and wartime. The last execution for crimes committed in peacetime took place in July 1863, when in Ypres a farmer was executed for murder. The last execution for an ordinary crime took place on 26 March 1918 at Veurne Prison when Emile Ferfaille, a military officer found guilty of killing his pregnant girlfriend, was guillotined. This was the first execution to be carried out since 1863. The guillotine that was used had to be imported from France.

Between November 1944 and August 1950 around 242 people were executed by firing squad for crimes committed during the Second World War. 241 of them had been convicted as collaborators. A total of 2940 persons were sentenced to death in this period, but only 242 executions were carried out. The last person ever to be executed in Belgium was the German war criminal Philipp Schmitt on 8 August 1950, the camp commander of the concentration camp Fort Breendonk. Although the Belgian Penal Code stipulated that the death penalty had to be carried out by decapitation, because the 242 persons executed following the Second World War were tried by a military court they were executed by firing squad.

On 1 January 1999, the Sixth Protocol to the European Convention of Human Rights, forbidding the death penalty in all circumstances, came into force and Belgium has also signed the second optional protocol of the International Covenant on Civil and Political Rights. On 2 February 2005, the prohibition of the death penalty was included in the Belgian Constitution by inserting an Article 14bis.
 

Belgium
Human rights in Belgium
Law of Belgium
Death in Belgium
1996 disestablishments in Belgium
Human rights abuses in Belgium